Andrew “Hurricane” Hernandez (born December 29, 1985) is an American professional boxer.

Professional boxing record

|style="text-align:center;" colspan="9"|30 fights, 20 wins (9 knockouts), 7 loss, 2 draw, 1 NC
|-style="text-align:center; background:#e3e3e3;"
|style="border-style:none none solid solid; "|
|style="border-style:none none solid solid; "|Result
|style="border-style:none none solid solid; "|Record
|style="border-style:none none solid solid; "|Opponent
|style="border-style:none none solid solid; "|Type
|style="border-style:none none solid solid; "|Rd., Time
|style="border-style:none none solid solid; "|Date
|style="border-style:none none solid solid; "|Location
|style="border-style:none none solid solid; "|Notes
|-align=center
|30
|Draw
|20-7-2 (1)
|align=left| Fidel Hernandez
|MD
|10
|Oct 20, 2018
|align=left|
|align=left|
|-align=center
|29
|Win
|20-7-1 (1)
|align=left| Roberto Yong
|UD
|8
|Jun 30, 2018
|align=left|
|align=left|
|-align=center
|28
|style="background: #DDD"|
|19-7-1 (1)
|align=left| Mike Gavronski
|NC
|10
|Nov 18, 2017
|align=left|
|align=left|
|-align=center
|27
|Loss
|19-7-1
|align=left| Caleb Plant
|UD
|10
|Sep 8, 2017
|align=left|
|align=left|
|-align=center
|26
|Loss
|19-6-1
|align=left| Patrick Teixeira
|UD
|8
|Jul 29, 2017
|align=left|
|align=left|
|-align=center
|25
|Win
|19-5-1
|align=left| Charly Valdez
|KO
|2 (6)
|Apr 29, 2017
|align=left|
|align=left|
|-align=center
|24
|Win
|18-5-1
|align=left| Sijuola Ade Shabazz
|UD
|10
|Feb 25, 2017
|align=left|
|align=left|
|-align=center
|23
|Win
|17-5-1
|align=left| Charly Soto
|KO
|2 (6)
|Jan 21, 2017
|align=left|
|align=left|
|-align=center
|22
|Loss
|16-5-1
|align=left| Jesse Hart
|TKO
|3 (10)
|Nov 4, 2016
|align=left|
|align=left|
|-align=center
|21
|Win
|16-4-1
|align=left| Adrian Lopez
|TKO
|4 (6)
|Oct 14, 2016
|align=left|
|align=left|
|-align=center
|20
|Win
|15-4-1
|align=left| David Cuen
|KO
|2 (6)
|Sep 3, 2016
|align=left|
|align=left|
|-align=center
|19
|Win
|14-4-1
|align=left| Jorge Silva
|RTD
|6 (10)
|Aug 26, 2016
|align=left|
|align=left|
|-align=center
|18
|Win
|13-4-1
|align=left| Mario Alexander Blanco
|KO
|1 (6)
|Jul 29, 2016
|align=left|
|align=left|
|-align=center
|17
|Win
|12-4-1
|align=left| Arif Magomedov
|UD
|10
|May 21, 2016
|align=left|
|align=left|
|-align=center
|16
|Win
|11-4-1
|align=left| Dionisio Miranda
|RTD
|7 (10), 
|March 26, 2016
|align=left|
|align=left|
|-align=center
|15
|Loss
|10-4-1
|align=left| Ahmed Elbiali
|UD
|8
|January 12, 2016
|align=left|
|align=left|
|-align=center
|14
|Loss
|10-3-1
|align=left| Kyrone Davis
|UD
|6
|December 29, 2015
|align=left|
|align=left|
|-align=center
|13
|Win
|10-2-1
|align=left| Jeff Page Jr
|TKO
|10 (10), 
|November 7, 2015
|align=left|
|align=left|
|-align=center
|12
|Loss
|9-2-1
|align=left| Louis Rose
|TKO
|8 (8), 
|August 15, 2015
|align=left|
|align=left|
|-align=center
|11
|Win
|9-1-1
|align=left| Eduardo Tercero
|UD
|6
|June 13, 2015
|align=left|
|align=left|
|-align=center
|10
|Loss
|8-1-1
|align=left| Jerry Odom
|TKO
|1 (8), 
|March 13, 2015
|align=left|
|align=left|
|-align=center
|9
|Win
|8-0-1
|align=left| Jerry Odom
|DQ
|4 (6), 
|January 9, 2015
|align=left|
|align=left|
|-align=center

References

External links
 

1985 births
Living people
American male boxers
Middleweight boxers
Boxers from Arizona
Sportspeople from Phoenix, Arizona